Mosaics is a live album by composer/bassist Graham Collier which was originally released on the British Philips label in 1971.

Reception

Allmusic said "Mosaics is one of Collier's most provocative works yet, and stands the test of time extremely well". On All About Jazz Nic Jones noted "As a bandleader Collier was by this time fashioning some distinctive frameworks for improvisation, and the group as a whole, with alto and tenor saxophonist Bob Sydor joining Beckett and Wakeman in the front line, seems so "bedded in" with Collier's work that the result is only stimulating listening of a rarefied order".

Track listing
All compositions by Graham Collier.

 "Piano Cadenza (Including Theme 1)" – 2:00
 "Theme 1 (Ensemble) and Flugel Solo" – 5:58
 "Duet Flugel and Soprano and Soprano Cadenza (Including Theme 4)" – 2:51
 "Theme 2 (Soprano and Rhythm) and Soprano Solo" – 3:42
 "Drum Cadenza (Including Theme 2) Into Theme 3 (Ensemble)" – 4:10
 "Flugel Cadenza (Including Theme 4) Duet Bass / Flugel" – 3:48
 "Theme 6 (Ensemble) and Tenor Solo (Sydor)" – 5:01
 "Tenor Cadenza (Sydor) and Tenor Duet" – 2:00
 "Piano Cadenza Into Theme 2 (Piano and Rhythm)" – 4:40
 "Flugel Solo Over Theme 8 in Tenors" – 6:07

Personnel
Graham Collier – bass
Harry Beckett – trumpet, flugelhorn
Alan Wakeman – tenor saxophone, soprano saxophone
Bob Sydor – tenor saxophone, alto saxophone
Geoff Castle – piano
John Webb – drums

References

1971 live albums
Graham Collier live albums
Philips Records live albums
Albums produced by Terry Brown (record producer)